Heather L. Igloliorte (born 1979) is an Inuk scholar, independent curator and art historian from Nunatsiavut.

She is an Associate Professor of Indigenous art history at Concordia University in Montreal, Quebec, where she holds the University Research Chair in Indigenous Circumpolar Arts. Previously, she was the Indigenous Art History and Community Engagement research chair at the university from 2016 to 2019.  She was a Scholar in Residence at the University of Winnipeg in Summer 2020.

Igloliorte is Co-Director of the Initiative for Indigenous Futures (IIF) Cluster at the Milieux Institute for Arts, Culture and Technology at Concordia University and is a special advisor to the university's provost on advancing Indigenous knowledges. 

She also holds Board positions with the Native North American Art Studies Association, the Inuit Art Foundation, and the Nunavut Film Development Corporation. Igloliorte further advises the Social Sciences and Humanities Research Council of Canada, the Federation for the Humanities and Social Sciences, the National Film Board of Canada and the Otsego Institute for Native American Art History at the Fenimore Art Museum in Cooperstown, New York.

Early life and education 
Igloliorte was born in Happy Valley-Goose Bay in 1979. James Igloliorte, her father, served as a Judge with the Provincial Court of Newfoundland and Labrador, making him Labrador’s first Inuk judge and one of the few practicing Indigenous magistrates in all of Canada.

Igloliorte obtained a Bachelor of Fine Arts from NSCAD University in 2003. She completed a Master of Arts in Canadian Art History at Carleton University in 2007 and obtained a Ph.D. in Cultural Mediations at Carleton University's Institute for Comparative Studies in Literature, Art and Culture (ICSLAC) in 2013.

Before becoming a scholar and an independent curator, Igloliorte was a practicing visual artist. Her work is held in various private and public collections, including the Senate of Canada.  She is the first Inuk art historian in Canada to hold a doctoral degree.

Research activities and curatorial projects 
Igloliorte's varied teaching and research interests primarily focus on historic and contemporary Inuit art in Canada and circumpolar art studies. A major objective of her academic praxis includes radically increasing Inuit participation in arts research and arts-based professional practice. She is achieving this through leadership of an academic grant that aims to empower circumpolar Indigenous peoples to become leaders in the arts through training and mentorship.

Her other interests include First Nations and Métis art in Canada; Native North American and global Indigenous arts; and Indigenous film, performance and new media practices.

She also researches Indigenous exhibition and collecting histories, curatorial theory and practice, along with the examination of decolonizing methodologies that include inquiries into colonization, survivance, sovereignty, resistance and resurgence.

Igloliorte's earlier curatorial projects included: the online collaborative exhibition "Inuit Art Alive" (2008), sponsored by the Inuit Art Foundation; "Decolonize Me" (2011), which debuted at the Ottawa Art Gallery and toured throughout Canada; and the nationally touring "We Were So Far Away: The Inuit Experience of Residential Schools" (2012), a Legacy of Hope Foundation project based on the oral histories of eight Inuit former students of the residential school system.

Her more recent curatorial projects include the "Land and Lifeways: Inuit Rights in the North" (2014) exhibit at the Canadian Museum for Human Rights; the first, nationally touring exhibition of Labrador Inuit art entitled "SakKijâjuk: Art and Craft from Nunatsiavut" (2016) which debuted at The Rooms; and "Ilippunga: The Brousseau Inuit Art Collection" (2016), a permanent exhibition at the Musée National des Beaux-Arts du Québec. She also co-curated "iNuit blanche" (2016), the world’s first all-circumpolar, one-night-only international arts festival held in St. John's, Newfoundland.  SakKijâjuk: Art and Craft from Nunatsiavut, which will tour until 2020, received an Outstanding Achievement Award from the Canadian Museums Association in 2017.

Her most current curatorial projects include "Among All These Tundras" (2018), a contemporary circumpolar art exhibition at Galerie Leonard & Bina Ellen at Concordia University and "Alootook Ipellie: Walking Both Sides of an Invisible Border" (2018), a retrospective exhibit held at the Carleton University Art Gallery. In 2018, Igloliorte was also appointed curatorial lead for the inaugural exhibition at the Inuit Art Centre at the Winnipeg Art Gallery. INUA (2021) was the first exhibition of contemporary Inuit art at the Winnipeg Art Gallery's new dedicated space to Inuit art, which is named Qaumajuq. 

In 2019, she co-founded the GLAM Collective (short for Galleries, Libraries, Archives and Museums), which explores new methods to exhibit Indigenous art to the Canadian public.

Publications 
Igloliorte has co-edited several books concerning Indigenous art and circumpolar cultural heritage. She has also edited catalogues for her respective Decolonize Me (2011), SakKijâjuk: Art and Craft from Nunatsiavut (2017) and Ilippunga: The Brousseau Inuit Art Collection (2016) exhibitions.

In 2018, her article Curating Inuit Qaujimajatuqangit: Inuit Knowledge in the Qallunaat Art Museum (2017) was recognized with an Art Journal Award by the College Art Association.

Her other publications include chapters and catalogue essays in Negotiations in a Vacant Lot: Studying the Visual in Canada (2014); Manifestations: New Native Art Criticism (2012); Changing Hands: Art Without Reservation 3 (2012); Curating Difficult Knowledge (2011); Native American Art at Dartmouth: Highlights from the Hood Museum of Art (2011); Inuit Modern (2010); and Response, Responsibility, and Renewal: Canada's Truth and Reconciliation Journey (2009).

She also co-edited a special edition of an arts journal focused on Indigenous new media, and co-authored an article outlining the cartography of Indigenous perspectives and knowledge in the Great Lakes Region.

References 

1979 births
Canadian art curators
Indigenous curators of the Americas
Living people
Inuit from Newfoundland and Labrador
Academic staff of Concordia University
Carleton University alumni
Canadian art historians
21st-century Canadian women
Canadian women curators
Canadian Inuit women
Women art historians
Canadian women academics
People from Happy Valley-Goose Bay